The Communications-Electronics Command (CECOM) is a Life Cycle Management Command (LCMC) of the United States Army based at Aberdeen Proving Ground, Maryland, United States. It is one of four such commands under the Army Materiel Command (AMC), and is the Army's provider and maintainer of Command, Control, Communications, Computers, Cyber, Intelligence, Surveillance and Reconnaissance (C5ISR) capabilities.

The 2005 Base Realignment and Closure decision relocated CECOM to Aberdeen Proving Ground, Maryland as part of implementing the 2005 Base Realignment and Closure law. Its former home, Fort Monmouth, New Jersey has been closed since 15 September 2011.
CECOM has approximately 13,000 military, civilian and contract personnel across six CECOM organizations: 
the Army Contracting Command-APG; 
the Army Medical Logisitics Command, Fort Detrick, Maryland;
Central Technical Support Facility, Fort Hood, Texas; 
CECOM Integrated Logistics Support Center, Aberdeen Proving Ground, Maryland; 
CECOM Software Engineering Center, Aberdeen Proving Ground, Maryland; 
Tobyhanna Army Depot, Pennsylvania
U.S. Army Information Systems Engineering Command, Fort Huachuca, Arizona.

Mission
CECOM specializes in communications-electronics systems and equipment, to include setting up headquarters and command and tactical operations centers in remote areas to installing and maintaining communications systems in vehicles and aircraft. CECOM also provides training activities, field support for modifications and upgrades, and logistical expertise. The C4ISR Materiel Enterprise is a subset of the Army's Materiel Enterprise; one of four Army Enterprises, which also include: Human Capital, Readiness, and Services and Infrastructure.

CERDEC transfer to AFC
In 2019 RDECOM, and thus CERDEC was transferred to U.S. Army Futures Command (AFC), and renamed as the Combat Capabilities Development Command, or DEVCOM, and the C5ISR Center respectively. The LCMC, namely United States Army Communications-Electronics Command, and the Program Executive Officers (PEOs) are to coordinate with AFC and their Cross-Functional Team (CFT)'s modernization efforts of materiel.

History
The history of the Communications-Electronics Command began with the establishment of a Signal Corps training facility and radio research and development laboratory at Fort Monmouth, NJ in 1917. In 1929, the Signal Corps' Electrical Laboratory of Washington and the Signal Corps Research Laboratory of New York merged with the Radio Laboratories at Fort Monmouth to form the consolidated "Signal Corps Laboratories."

In 1949, the Signal Corps Center was established and consolidated many existing Signal functions to include: the Signal Corps Engineering Laboratories, the Signal Corps Board, Signal School, Signal Corps Publications Agency, Signal Corps Intelligence Unit, Pigeon Breeding and Training Center, the Army portion of the Electro Standards Agency, and the Signal Corps troop units.

The forerunner of the Army Air Corps and the U.S. Air Force had its roots at Fort Monmouth. In 1928, the first radio-equipped meteorological balloon soared into the upper reaches of the atmosphere, a forerunner of a weather sounding technique universally used today. In 1938, the first U.S. aircraft detection radar was developed at the Signal Corps Center. In 1946, space communications was proved feasible when the Diana Radar was used to bounce electronic signals off the moon.

The Army disbanded the technical services and established the Electronics Command (ECOM) at Fort Monmouth in 1962. This CECOM predecessor was charged with managing Signal research, development, and logistics support. As a subordinate element of the newly formed United States Army Materiel Command (AMC), ECOM encompassed the Signal Research and Development Laboratories, the Signal Materiel Support Agency, the Signal Supply Agency and its various procurement offices, and other Signal Corps logistics support activities.
ECOM was fragmented in January 1978 on the recommendation of the Army Materiel Acquisition Review Committee (AMARC) in order to form the following three Commands and one Activity: The Communications and Electronics Materiel Readiness Command (CERCOM), the Communications Research and Development Command (CORADCOM), the Electronics Research and Development Command (ERADCOM), and the Avionics Research and Development Activity (AVRADA).

Reassessment of the changes at Fort Monmouth, begun in August 1980, concluded that, while the emphasis on research and development had increased for the better, there was also much duplication of effort. Thus, on 1 March 1981, AMC combined CERCOM and CORADCOM to form the new Communications-Electronics Command (CECOM), effective 1 May 1981.

The 1993 Base Realignment and Closure Commission mandated the closing of the Evans Area, Vint Hill Farms Station, moving the United States Army Communications-Electronics Research, Development and Engineering Center to Fort Monmouth under CECOM. Additionally, CECOM gained some missions and personnel from the Fort Belvoir Research and Development Center.

The 2005 Base Realignment and Closure Commission ordered the closure of Fort Monmouth and the relocation of CECOM to Aberdeen Proving Ground (APG), Maryland. The CECOM flag was cased at Fort Monmouth on 10 September 2010, and the colors were uncased on 22 October 2010, marking CECOM’s official arrival at APG, occupying the newly completed C5ISR Center of Excellence. Comprising six primary organizations, the C5ISR Materiel Enterprise includes two organizations from AMC, one from the U.S. Army Comabat Capabilities Development Command (DEVCOM) and three from United States Assistant Secretary of the Army for Acquisition, Logistics, and Technology (ASA(ALT)). AMC organizations include: U.S. Army Communications-Electronics Command; and the Army Contracting Command-APG. The DEVCOM command is the C5ISR Center; and the  ASA(ALT) provides three Program Executive Offices to the team including: Program Executive Office Command Control Communications Tactical (PEO C3T); PEO for Intelligence, Electronic Warfare and Sensors; and PEO for Enterprise Information Systems.

Famous firsts
 1918: Standardization and quality control of vacuum tubes for military radios resulted in a total standard for vacuum tube production for both military and civilian applications.
 1928: The first radio-equipped weather balloon was launched in 1928. This was the first major development in the application of electronics to the study of weather, and of conditions in the upper atmosphere.
 1938: Aircraft Detection radar was developed at Fort Monmouth, the Evans Signal Laboratories, and at Fort Hancock at Sandy Hook in 1938, providing the first U.S. capability of aircraft detection and early warning. Radar sets, such as the SCR-270, were used in World War II and also later in the civilian aviation industry.
 1940: Development of the SCR-300 first portable, hand-held, FM "walkie-talkie" for use in the front lines occurred. This was the first major development in the miniaturization of radio equipment.
 1946: On 10 January 1946, Fort Monmouth took the first electronic step into space when the first radar signal was bounced off the moon using a modified SCR-271. It took the Diana radar 2-1/2 seconds to reach the moon and return. This proved the feasibility of extraterrestrial radio communications.
 1948: The first synthetically produced large quartz crystals were grown by researchers at Fort Monmouth. The crystals were able to be used in the manufacture of electronic components, and made the U.S. largely independent of foreign imports for this critical mineral.
 1949: On 28 September, a record height of 140,000 feet was set by a high-altitude balloon of the Signal Corps Engineering Laboratories at Fort Monmouth.
 1957: COL William Blair finally received his radar patent, U.S. Patent Number 2,803,819. He is remembered as the "father of American radar."
 1958: Development of solar cells for satellite power in space. The solar cells developed by Fort Monmouth scientists powered the Vanguard I satellite in space for more than five years.
 1958: The first communication satellite, Project SCORE, was developed in 1958. Launched on 18 December, Project SCORE (Signal Communications via Orbiting Relay Experiment) broadcast President Eisenhower's Christmas greeting, proving that voice and code signals could be relayed over vast distances using satellite communication technology developed at Fort Monmouth.
 1959: The first Weather Satellite, the Vanguard 2, was launched on 19 February 1959, equipped to map the earth's cloud patterns by a varying infrared scanning device. The electronics for the satellite were developed at Fort Monmouth.
 1960: The first televised weather satellite, Tiros-1, was developed under the technical supervision of the Fort Monmouth Laboratories. Tiros-1 sent the first televised weather photographs of the earth's cloud cover and weather patterns to the giant 60-foot "Space Sentry" antenna at Fort Monmouth.
 1960: The first Large Scale Mobile Computer, the Mobile Digital Computer  (MOBIDIC), was developed at Fort Monmouth. It was the first computer developed for use at the Field Army and theater levels. This van-mounted computer was the first experiment in automating combat support function in artillery, surveillance, logistics and battlefield administration.
1971: A system test bed first demonstrated the ability from an airborne platform to intercept signals. GUARDRAIL evolved through multiple product improvements to become "the most prolific intelligence system in the field." Its many "firsts" include the first tactical, airborne, remotely controlled COMINT system, the first multiple platform Signals intelligence system, and the first COMINT system that could be controlled through a satellite relay.
 1975: Automatic Telephone Central Office: The solid state AN/TTC-38 is smaller and lighter than manual switch systems. It is faster and more easily maintained. It gives the user touch-dialing to anywhere in the worldwide military telephone system.

List of commanding generals
Source:

References

External links
CECOM website
CECOM Historical Office
Army Materiel Command website
Office of the Secretary of Defense, Base Realignment and Closure

Communications-Electronics Command
Communications-Electronics Command